Elina Svitolina was the defending champion and successfully defended her title, beating Daria Kasatkina in the final, 6–4, 6–0.

Kasatkina through the way to her first Dubai final saved match points against Johanna Konta & Garbiñe Muguruza in her second round & semifinal matches respectively.

Since Caroline Wozniacki was defending finalist points from 2017 and chose not to participate this year, Simona Halep regained the WTA no. 1 singles ranking at the conclusion of the tournament.

Seeds
The top four seeds received a bye into the second round.

Draw

Finals

Top half

Bottom half

Qualifying

Seeds

Qualifiers

Lucky loser

Draw

First qualifier

Second qualifier

Third qualifier

Fourth qualifier

References

External links
Main draw
Qualifying draw

Women's Singles
2018 WTA Tour